Tadaxa bijungens is a moth of the family Noctuidae first described by Francis Walker in 1865. It is found in Sri Lanka.

Labial palps are longer, slender and upcurved. Antennae of male are fasciculate or ciliate.

References

Moths of Asia
Moths described in 1865